Joseph Carter Swaim (January 23, 1904 – August 7, 1997) was an American professor emeritus of New Testament literature and exegesis at Western Theological Seminary and the head of the Bible department of the National Council of Churches in New York. He also served in pastorates at Presbyterian churches in Staten Island and St. Louis, the Church of the Covenant on Manhattan's East Side and the United Nations.

Life 

Swaim was born in Selma, Alabama and he died at the Presbyterian Medical Center in Washington.

Swaim estudied at Washington and Jefferson College and Western Theological Seminary (now Pittsburgh Theological). He gained in 1927 his M.Div. at Western Theological Seminary. He earned a PhD with the thesis The historical charachter of the Fourth Gospel at the School of Theology of the University of Edinburgh.

He was professor of New Testament at the faculty of Western Theological Seminary in Pittsburgh. In 1954 Swaim joined the National Council of Churches to head its Bible department.

Works

Thesis

Books

References

Sources 

1904 births
1994 deaths
Alumni of the University of Edinburgh